The following highways are numbered 384:

Canada
Manitoba Provincial Road 384

Japan
 Japan National Route 384

United States
  Interstate 384
  Georgia State Route 384
  Maryland Route 384
  New York State Route 384
  Puerto Rico Highway 384
  Virginia State Route 384